dOP is a French electronic music trio.  Since their inception in 2006, they have received recognition, in the electronic music landscape, securing a spot on Resident Advisor's Top Live Acts for 2010, 2011 and 2012.

Career
The trio is composed of childhood friends Damien Vandesande, Clément Aichelbaum and Jonathan Illel, who worked together on numerous projects before establishing themselves under the moniker dOP.  Following some experimentation with different styles from hip-hop to rock.  They began making waves in the electronic/house circuit with a string of single and EP releases on various labels including their own Circus Company, Milnor Modern, Eklo, Supplement Facts and more.

Nicolas Sfintescu from Nôze can be cited as one of the heavy influences of dOP's music.  Sfintescu shares the same idea of making organic dance music in the classical way of composing with real instruments and voices.  They found a way to translate their respective gifts for percussion, woodwind instruments and honey-coated vocals into something that made sense on the contemporary European dance floor.  Through this concept, dOP took electronic music performances to a new level, becoming entertainers on stage in the same fashion as rock n roll musicians and hip hop artists.

In 2010, they launched their first full length album Greatest Hits, a tongue-in-cheek title for the then-newcomers.

Discography

Albums
 2010: Greatest Hits, Circus Company

Singles & EPs
 2007: Between The Blues EP, Circus Company
 2007: No Passport EP, Milnor Modern
 2008: Blanche Neige. Circus Company
 2008: I'm Just A Man EP, Eklo
 2008: Panik, Milnor Modern
 2008: Varoslav feat dOP - Inside Ways, Supplement Facts
 2008: The Lighthouse, Orac Records
 2008: God Bless The Child EP, Orac Records
 2009: Varoslav feat dOP - I Love Us, Dirt Crew Recordings
 2009: The Genius Of The Crowd, Supplement Facts
 2009: Martyn / dOP - Tucan EP, Watergate Records
 2009: I'm Just A Man Remix EP, Eklo
 2009: dOP & Lula Circus - Cange! A Various EP, Children of Tomorrow 
 2009: Dein Varlangen EP, Eklo
 2010: Youandwean / dOP - Sub Rosa EP, Magicbag
 2010: Penguin EP, Watergate Records
 2010: 3 Suitcases, Circus Company
 2010: L’Hôpital, La Rue, La Prison, Circus Company
 2010: President Bongo & dOP - Gossip Rats, I'm Single
 2010: VSOP - Dein Verlangen Remix EP, Eklo
 2011: Your Sex, Supplement Facts
 2011: No More Daddy, Circus Company
 2011: Seuil & dOP - Prostitute EP, Eklo
 2011: Masomenos & Dop - Masomenos & Friends Project: 8, Welcome To Masomenos
 2011: After Party, Life And Death
 2012: The Odyssey Of Dreamy Peace EP, Apt. International
 2012: Kisses, Circus Company
 Unknown: Untitled

DJ Mixes
 2008: LWE Podcast 02, Little White Earbuds
 2010: Watergate 06, Watergate Records
 2010: Sgustok Magazine Podcast 001, Sgustok Magazine
 2011: Trax 142, Trax Sampler
 2014:  001  , Cocoon

Miscellaneous
 2012: A.O.T.P ft. dOP - OPA!, Snatch! Records

References

External links 
 
 Beatport
 dOP Resident Advisor

French electronic music groups
Musical groups established in 2006
French musical trios